USS Huntsville may refer to the following ships operated by the United States:

, a Union Navy steamer during the American Civil War
, a range tracking ship, converted in 1961

United States Navy ship names